An order of magnitude is generally a factor of ten. A quantity growing by four orders of magnitude implies it has grown by a factor of 10000 or 104. However, because computers are binary, orders of magnitude are sometimes given as powers of two.

This article presents a list of multiples, sorted by orders of magnitude, for bit rates measured in bits per second. Since some bit rates may measured in other quantities of data or time (like MB/s), information to assist with converting to and from these formats is provided. This article assumes the following:
A group of 8 bits (8 bit) constitutes one byte (1 B). The byte is the most common unit of measurement of information (megabyte, mebibyte, gigabyte, gibibyte, etc.).
The decimal SI prefixes kilo, mega etc., are powers of 10. The power of two equivalents are the binary prefixes kibi, mebi, etc.

Accordingly:
 1 kB (kilobyte) = 1000 bytes = 8000 bits
 1 KiB (kibibyte) = 210 bytes = 1024 bytes = 8192 bits
 1 kbit (kilobit) = 125 bytes = 1000 bits
 1 Kibit (kibibit) = 210 bits = 1024 bits = 128 bytes

See also 
 Data-rate units
 List of interface bit rates
 Spectral efficiency
 Orders of magnitude (data)
 Orders of magnitude (time)

References 

Bit rate